Aughton is a hamlet adjacent to the village of Collingbourne Kingston in Wiltshire, England.

Aughton took its name from Aeffe, the owner in the 10th century. After Aeffe's death, the land passed to Hyde Abbey, Winchester, and the estate was merged with Collingbourne Kingston manor.

Aughton House is from the 17th century.

References

External links

 

Hamlets in Wiltshire